Lansbury Park is a residential suburb area of the town of Caerphilly in Wales.

Location 

The estate was built as council housing (by housebuilders and civil contractors John Laing) in the 1960s on former farmland. It is located in the eastern part of the town and is overshadowed, though at some distance by the concentric castle of Caerphilly Castle, the 2nd biggest of its type in Europe.

A Morrisons supermarket and petrol station with a convenience store are located nearby.

The estate was named after George Lansbury the politician. He was Leader of the Labour Party from 1932 to 1935. He was the grandfather of Angela Lansbury, the star of Murder She Wrote and other TV dramas. There is a Lansbury Estate in Tower Hamlets in London named after George Lansbury as well.

External links
www.geograph.co.uk : photos of Lansbury Park and surrounding areas

Caerphilly